Volgograd-Glavny is a major junction railway station of  Volgograd in Russia.

It is located in the Central District of the city at Railway Station Square, 1. The station is one of the largest in Russia and serves long-distance trains and suburban trains. The station is the hub for services to five main destinations: Krasnodar, Rostov-on-Don, Moscow, Saratov and Astrakhan.

History
The first railway to serve Tsaritsyn (now Volgograd) was the Volga-Don railway in 1862. The first railway station was constructed of wood. In 1871 the station was replaced with a brick structure.

During the Second World War, the building was almost completely destroyed in the Battle of Stalingrad. In the period from July 1951 to May 1954 the new station building was erected  on the site of the old building. The station commissioned June 2, 1954. In 1997 the building of the railway station was designated an architectural monument. In 2005, the station building was renovated for the 60th anniversary of Victory Day, the capitulation of Nazi Germany to the Soviet Union in the Second World War.

On December 29, 2013, the station was the site of a suicide bombing in which at least 16 people were killed. The station was re-opened after reconstruction on May 7, 2014, just in time for Victory Day holidays. The reopening featured ceremonies presided over by regional governor Andrey Bocharov and the Orthodox Church's Volgograd metropolitan bishop.

Description
The building is an example of the Stalinist architecture style which was popular in Russia from the 1930s until Stalin's death in the 1950s. The station is a three-story building with a ground floor tower crowned with a spire. The building is made of a combination of brick and concrete, the facade consists of ornamented granite. The interior walls are mainly marble. The ceiling is decorated with stucco and several paintings of the battles that took place in the city.

Trains
 Moscow — Volgograd
 Saratov — Adler
 Moscow — Baku
 St.Petersburg — Volgograd
 Adler — Krasnoyarsk
 Anapa — Krasnoyarsk
 Anapa — Tomsk

References

External link

Railway stations in Volgograd Oblast
Railway stations in the Russian Empire opened in 1862
Railway stations in Russia opened in 1954
1862 establishments in the Russian Empire
Buildings and structures in Volgograd
Cultural heritage monuments of regional significance in Volgograd Oblast